The 2020 Ann Arbor Challenger was a professional tennis tournament played on indoor hard courts. It was the first edition of the tournament which was a part of the 2020 ATP Challenger Tour. It took place in Ann Arbor, Michigan, United States between January 6 and 12, 2020.

Singles main-draw entrants

Seeds

 1 Rankings are as of December 30, 2019.

Other entrants
The following players received wildcards into the singles main draw:
 Andrew Fenty
 Aleksandar Kovacevic
 John McNally
 Ondřej Štyler
 Zachary Svajda

The following players received entry into the singles main draw using protected rankings:
  Nicolás Barrientos
  Patrick Kypson

The following players received entry from the qualifying draw:
 Alejandro Gómez
 Strong Kirchheimer

Champions

Singles

  Ulises Blanch def.  Roberto Cid Subervi 3–6, 6–4, 6–2.

Doubles

  Robert Galloway /  Hans Hach Verdugo def.  Nicolás Barrientos /  Alejandro Gómez 4–6, 6–4, [10–8].

References

2020 ATP Challenger Tour
2020 in American tennis
2020 in sports in Michigan
January 2020 sports events in the United States
Ann Arbor Challenger